Helmdon Village railway station on the Stratford-upon-Avon and Midland Junction Railway (SMJ) served the Northamptonshire village of Helmdon between 1872 and 1951. It was one of two stations serving the lightly populated rural area, the other being Helmdon railway station on the Great Central Main Line, and its closure marked the beginning of the years of decline for the SMJ line.

History
A station was erected in a shallow cutting spanned at its western end by a twin-arched road bridge carrying the village street (now known as Station Road) across the line. The station building and track layout was similar in style to that at neighbouring : a one-storey symmetrical red brick building and a single loop siding on the Wappenham side,  from the station, linked to the main line. Unlike Wappenham, Helmdon had a small red brick gabled goods shed which spanned the siding and contained a goods office and internal loading platform.

The station had two platforms enclosing a passing loop, but only one of these was used for regular passenger services. The other was used on race days. The loop was taken out of service with the amalgamation of the N&BJ with the Stratford-upon-Avon and Midland Junction Railway in 1910;  to Cockley Brake junction became one section.

A temporary line was laid from Helmdon station to a construction yard with several sidings at the viaduct's planned site. The opening of the Great Central station at  created potential for confusion until 1928, when the GCR's successor the London and North Eastern Railway renamed it "Helmdon for Sulgrave". The SMJR station was closer to Helmdon village, so in 1950 British Railways renamed it "Helmdon Village".

Passenger traffic was sparse, with Helmdon being a village of only 516 people in 1901, and it was one of the least successful in terms of passenger traffic on the line. Goods traffic continued for three more months.

Routes

Present day
The station buildings were used for some time as a bus garage, before being demolished. From Helmdon, the abandoned trackbed passes beneath the still-extant Great Central viaduct (itself disused and derelict), while Cockley Brake junction is obscured by dense vegetation.

References

Disused railway stations in Northamptonshire
Former Stratford-upon-Avon and Midland Junction Railway stations
Railway stations in Great Britain opened in 1872
Railway stations in Great Britain closed in 1951
West Northamptonshire District